Gradimir Smudja (born in Novi Sad, 1956) is a Serbian cartoonist/painter in Italy and France. He is currently resident of Lucca, Tuscany, (Italy).

Smudja only recently published an acclaimed comic "Le Cabaret des Muses" (first called "Le Bordel des Muses"; tomes: I, II, III, IV), telling the life story of the French masterpainter Toulouse-Lautrec. The comic is being sold all over Europe and has been published in French, Dutch, Spanish, Serbian, German, Hungarian, Italian and other languages. This was a follow-up to the much-acclaimed comic Vincent et Van Gogh, the epic story about the Dutch painter Vincent van Gogh and his cat.

Published works 

Comics:
 Vincent et Van Gogh                    - Delcourt (2003), 
 Le Bordel des Muses "Au Moulin Rouge"  - Delcourt (2004), 
 Le Cabaret des Muses "Mimi et Henri"   - Delcourt (2005), 
 Le Cabaret des Muses "Allez Darling"   - Delcourt (2007), 
 Le Cabaret des Muses "Darling, pour toujours"   - Delcourt (2008), 
 Vincent et Van Gogh  "Trois lunes"     - Delcourt (2010), 

Art books:
 Circo dell'Arte - Nebelsplater/Verlag      (1991), 
 Schneeflöckli - Carlo De Simoni            (1999), ISBN W002 99
 Die Sonnenschein-Bande - Pepperwood/Smudja (2000), 
 Dylan Faces Book - Zanpano                 (2009),

External links
 Comic Creator: Gradimir Smudja, Lambiek Comiclopedia
 Smudja Bio-Bibliography, Bedetheque (fr)
 Bordel des muses / Cabaret des muses (Le) (fr)

1956 births
Artists from Lucca
Artists from Novi Sad
Serbian cartoonists
Serbian comics artists
Serbian comics writers
Serbian painters
Serbian illustrators
Serbian expatriates in Italy
Living people